"Somebody's Problem" is a song recorded by American country music singer Morgan Wallen. It was released on November 20, 2020 from his second studio album Dangerous: The Double Album. The song was co-written by Wallen, Ernest Keith Smith, Jacob Durrett and Rodney Clawson, and produced by Joey Moi.

Background
"Somebody's Problem" started with Wallen spotting a Southern woman. He said the woman is the "Kinda girl once she steps out, the world stands still." He is smitten, but he thinks she might have been mistreated in the past: "She's somebody's problem, somebody's goodbye / Somebody's last call number that they can't find."

Content
"Somebody's Problem" is a narrative that is all about a budding new relationship, with the start of one relationship, another one ends. In lyrics, Wallen thinks how a woman who is too good to be true could have slipped through an ex's fingers and guesses she is somebody's problem or goodbye, best day or worst night.

Charts

Weekly charts

Year-end charts

Certifications

References

2020 songs
Morgan Wallen songs
Songs written by Morgan Wallen
Songs written by Rodney Clawson
Song recordings produced by Joey Moi
Songs written by Ernest (musician)